Scaphis is a genus of air-breathing sea slugs, a shell-less marine pulmonate gastropod mollusks in the family Onchidiidae.

Species
According to the World Register of Marine Species (WoRMS), the following species with valid names are included within the genus Scaphis :
 Scaphis astridae (Labbé, 1934)
 Scaphis atra (Lesson, 1830)
 Scaphis carbonaria Labbé, 1934
 Scaphis gravieri Labbé, 1934
 Scaphis lata Labbé, 1934
 Scaphis punctata (Quoy & Gaimard, 1832)
 Scaphis straelenii (Labbé, 1934)
 Scaphis tonkinensis Labbé, 1934
 Scaphis viridis Labbé, 1934

References

Onchidiidae